Fatma Sultan ("One who abstains") was an Ottoman princess, daughter of Sultan Murad III (reign 1575–1595) and Safiye Sultan, and sister of Sultan Mehmed III (reign 1595–1603) of the Ottoman Empire.

Early life
Fatma Sultan was a daughter of Sultan Murad III, and his consort Safiye Sultan.  She had two full brothers, Sultan Mehmed III, and Şehzade Mahmud, and two full sisters Ayşe Sultan, Hümaşah Sultan. Her other possibly full siblings were Şehzade Selim and Mihrimah Sultan.

Marriages
On 6 December 1593, Fatma, at Murad's behest, married Halil Pasha, Admiral of the Fleet. The wedding took place at the Old Palace, and was celebrated in a seven-day ceremony. The historian Mustafa Selaniki described the excitement of the crowds who turned out to watch the elaborate processional that carried Fatma, who was concealed behind a screen of red satin, to the palace of her new husband. Selaniki wrote that at the wedding of Fatma "skirtfulls of shiny new coins were distributed... those who did not receive any sighed with longing." According to the historian Hoca Sadeddin Efendi, her dowry was 300,000 ducats.
As part of the celebrations, the members of the Imperial Council were given a seven-day leave.

In 1595, Halil Pasha did not sail with the fleet. This was particularly because neither Safiye nor Fatma were willing to let him leave Istanbul. Their reluctance probably stemmed from the fact that Fatma was pregnant. She gave birth to a son in October 1595, which strengthened the new Sultan Mehmed's and Safiye's affection for Halil Pasha.

After Halil Pasha's death in 1603, she married Cafer Pasha in  December 1604. He was then in charge of securing the passes on the Danube. In order to consummate his marriage, Cafer Pasha was immediately called back to the capital and given a seat in the imperial council with the rank of full vizier. Cafer Pasha became governor of Cyprus in 1608, where Fatma probably followed him. He stayed on this position until his death. 

There are sources that state that Fatma was married two more times. After the death of Cafer Pasha, she married in 1610 Hizir Pasha, governor of Van 1582, Karaman, and Tamashvar 1592, who was very old and died shortly after the wedding. Later, she married Murat Pasha (1611/1613), who was vizier and a member of the Divan.

Death and legacy
When Fatma died, she was buried in her father's mausoleum, located at the courtyard of the Hagia Sophia Mosque, Istanbul, and  recorded, among other things, as Halil Pasha's wife.

She owned a translation of "The Ascension of Propitious Stars and Sources of Sovereignty" (Matali' us-sa'ade ve menabi' us-siyade).

We know that in 1582 Nakkaş Osman Pasha illustrated a horoscope book for  Fatma Sultan. This manuscript, in which Nakkaş Osman is named as the illustrator, is in the Bibliothèque Nationale in Paris.

Issue
By her first marriage, Fatma Sultan had two sons:
Sultanzade Mahmud Bey (1595–1598)
Sultanzade Hasan Bey (between 1596 and 1604 - after 1620)

References

Sources
 

16th-century Ottoman princesses
17th-century Ottoman princesses